Filippo Filonardi (1582–1622) was a Roman Catholic cardinal.

On 28 December 1608, he was consecrated bishop by Michelangelo Tonti, Cardinal-Priest of San Bartolomeo all'Isola, with Metello Bichi, Bishop Emeritus of Sovana, and Valeriano Muti, Bishop of Città di Castello, serving as co-consecrators.

Episcopal succession

References

1582 births
1622 deaths
17th-century Italian cardinals
People from the Province of Frosinone